SELTHER is a transnational Mexican company active in the mattress and bedding industry. At present Selther is one of the leaders in Mexico and Latin America in the mattress industry.

SELTHER was established in Mexico City in 1970 with a small production unit. Through the 1980s Selther opened new production plants in Monterrey NL, Guadalajara JAL and the State of Mexico.

Since 2001 Selther is part of GARD Group. Based in Monterrey, NL GARD Group is active in some industries such as real estate, industrial manufacturing and RFID technology development.

In 1995 Selther began exporting to the US and to Central America. In July 2006 Selther opened a new plant in Costa Rica to attend the Central and South American markets while in 2007 it opened a plant in Mexicali and started operations in Europe.

Starting 2009, Selther has entered a strong downsizing process mainly due to the current economic situation which has led to cut off 40% of the labour force and the shut down of the Mexicali plant and the Madrid offices.. As of September 2009, Jose Benavides Luna has been appointed as the new CEO.
	

Manufacturing companies based in Monterrey
Mattress retailers of Mexico
Mexican brands